David Rawle (born 16 October 2000) is an Irish actor from Carrigallen, County Leitrim. He is best known for starring in the Irish sitcom Moone Boy, co-written by and co-starring Chris O'Dowd. His first audition for acting was for Santa Claus. In 2012, he was nominated at the British Comedy Awards for Best Comedy Breakthrough Artist.

Career
Between 2012 and 2015, David played Martin Moone in Moone Boy, an Irish sitcom on Sky One. In the series, which is set in the early 1990s, he had an imaginary friend called Seán; he is the youngest child of a family living in rural Boyle, County Roscommon. Martin, aided by his imaginary friend, has a unique perspective on life. His imagination comes into play both in his childish drawings, which come alive through animation, and in the ridiculous schemes he comes up with, against Seán's better judgement. With Seán's help, Martin negotiates life as the youngest in a chaotic, scatter-brained Irish family.

He also provides the voice of Ben in the 2014 film, Song of the Sea. Since September 2011, he has been a member of the Leitrim Youth Theatre in Carrigallen. In January 2013, he (along with Moone Boy co-star Ian O'Reilly) appeared in Bressie's music video for his single Show Me Love.

Filmography

Television

Film

Personal life
He has two older sisters and has been attending drama classes since he was 4 years old. His hobbies also include reading, swimming, karate, and playing the piano and drums.

References

External links
 

2000 births
Living people
Irish male child actors
People from County Leitrim